(stylised as SEAdLINNNG) is a Japanese women's professional wrestling promotion founded in 2015 by former Stardom wrestler and founder Nanae Takahashi. Their roster is predominantly made up of outside talent from other promotions such as Ice Ribbon, Gatoh Move Pro Wrestling and World Woman Pro-Wrestling Diana, as well as veterans and freelancers.

History 
After 5 years with World Wonder Ring Stardom, founder Nanae Takahashi left the promotion in the wake of the in-ring incident between Yoshiko and Act Yasukawa. A few months after leaving, Takahashi, along with retired wrestler Natsuki☆Taiyo, announced the formation of her own promotion, to be known as Seadlinnng (stylised as SEAdLINNNG) on June 12, 2015. The reasoning for the name was a combination between seedling, symbolising the new promotion, and "to cross the sea". The promotion's debut show, Let's Get Started, took place on August 26, 2015 in Korakuen Hall. In February 2016, Yoshiko Hirano, a trainee of both Takahashi and Taiyo who retired from pro wrestling in 2015 following a legitimate in-ring incident with fellow wrestler Act Yasukawa, announced she would be coming out of retirement to compete for Seadlinnng. In September of the same year, Seadlinnng announced a partnership with American promotion Ring Of Honor's women's division, Women of Honor. This partnership lead to American wrestlers such as ODB and Veda Scott competing in Sead. In January 2017, the promotion gained another signed wrestler in Arisa Nakajima, who had resigned from JWP the previous month. One month later, World Woman Pro-Wrestling Diana mainstay Sareee announced she too would sign with the promotion, however, she left and returned to Diana in September of the same year.

On December 14, 2021, it was revealed that Takahashi would leave the promotion as a wrestler and as the president of the company after the Korakuen Hall show on December 29.

Roster

Wrestlers

Staff

Alumni

Notable guests

 Akane Fujita
 Aoi Kizuki
 Hanako Nakamori
 Hikari Shimizu
 Hiroe Nagahama
 Kaoru Ito
 Mika Iida
 Mika Iwata
 Miyuki Takase
 Mochi Miyagi
 Rydeen Hagane
 Suzu Suzuki
 Thekla
 Totoro Satsuki
 Yuki Mashiro
 Yuu Yamagata

Championships 

See also 

Professional wrestling in Japan
List of professional wrestling promotions in Japan

References

External links 
 Seadlinnng Official Website (in Japanese)

Japanese women's professional wrestling promotions
Sport in Kawasaki, Kanagawa
2015 establishments in Japan